Zühlke is a German surname. Notable people with the surname include:

Detlef Zühlke (born 1949), German engineer and professor
Steffen Zühlke (born 1965), German rower

Zühlke
Zühlke, innovation company based in Zurich, Switzerland

German-language surnames